Charles Smith Barbour (November 13, 1904 – December 27, 1964) was an American football tackle in the National Football League (NFL). Born in Martinsville, Virginia, Barbour played college football for the VMI Keydets, selected All-Southern in 1923.  The 1923 team went 9–1. Only an upset by William Alexander's Georgia Tech stopped an undefeated season. He also wrestled at VMI. He played for the Buffalo Bisons in 1925.

References

1904 births
1964 deaths
American football tackles
VMI Keydets football players
All-Southern college football players
Buffalo Bisons (NFL) players
Players of American football from Virginia
People from Martinsville, Virginia
American male sport wrestlers